Malaysia Airlines, Malaysia's flag carrier, traces its origins back to 1947, when Malayan Airways was jointly formed by Singapore's Straits Steamship Company and the Ocean Steamship Company of Liverpool. The carrier was registered in Singapore and was set up for linking several cities within Malaya, as well as to provide an air connection with Borneo and other parts of the region. In 1947, the newly formed airline started scheduled operations with a single Airspeed Consul, linking Singapore-Kallang Airport with Kuala Lumpur and Penang, and Kuala Lumpur with Kota Bharu and Kuantan. 
By 1948, the domestic route network comprised Ipoh, Kuala Lumpur, Penang, Singapore, Kota Bharu and Kuantan, whereas international flights to Batavia, Bangkok, Medan, Saigon and Palembang were also operated. In , Malayan Airways took over the Singapore–Kuching–Labuan–Jesselton route, which had been operated by the Royal Air Force since  and was the only air link between Singapore and Borneo. The run was extended to Sandakan in October that same year.

On , the airline officially became the national airline of Malaysia and Singapore, jointly operated by both countries.

MSA began to deploy its de Havilland Comet aircraft on the Kuala Lumpur–Singapore route, and also on services radiating from these two cities to Bangkok, Hong Kong, Manila, Perth and Taipei. These aircraft were used on selected domestic routes as well. A year later, Jakarta and Sydney were already incorporated into the international route network, with the Singapore–Jakarta–Perth–Sydney service using a Boeing 707 that was leased from Qantas, and by  Tokyo was included as well.

The new airline's route network initially consisted of domestic flights plus international services to Bangkok, Hong Kong, Jakarta, Medan and Singapore. By , Bandar Seri Begawan, Dubai, Haadyai, Kota Kinabalu, Kuching, London, Madras, Manila, Sydney, Taipei and Tokyo were added to these destinations, with Amsterdam, Frankfurt, Jeddah, Melbourne, Paris, Perth and Seoul also being served ten years later.

In , from its main hub at Kuala Lumpur International Airport, Malaysia Airlines operated scheduled services to domestic destinations including Alor Setar, Bakalalan, Bario, Belaga, Bintulu, Ipoh, Johor Bahru, Kota Bharu, Kota Kinabalu, Kuala Terengganu, Kuantan, Kuching, Kudat, Labuan, Lahad Datu, Langkawi, Lawas, Layang-Layang, Limbang, Long Lellang, Marudi, Medan, Miri, Mukah, Mulu, Penang, Pulau, Sandakan, Semporna, Sibu, Tarakan, Tawau and Tomanggong. International destinations served at the time included Adelaide, Amsterdam, Auckland, Bandar Seri Begawan, Bangkok, Beijing, Beirut, Brisbane, Buenos Aires, Cairns, Cairo, Cape Town, Cebu, Chennai, Chiang Mai, Darwin, Delhi, Bali, Dhaka, Dubai, Frankfurt, Fukuoka, Guangzhou, Hanoi, Hat Yai, Ho Chi Minh City, Hong Kong, Istanbul, Jakarta, Jeddah, Johannesburg, Kaohsiung, Karachi, London, Los Angeles, Malé, Manchester, Manila, Melbourne, Munich, Nagoya, New York, Osaka, Paris, Perth, Phnom Penh, Phuket, Pontianak, Rome, Seoul, Shanghai, Singapore, Surabaya, Sydney, Taipei, Tokyo, Vienna, Xiamen, Yangon, Zagreb and Zürich.

List
, Malaysia Airlines flies to the following destinations.

See also

 Transport in Malaysia

Notes

References

External links

 
 
 

Destinations
Lists of airline destinations
Oneworld destinations